Riverlea may refer to:

Riverlea, Ohio, a small United States city
Riverlea, New Zealand, a suburb of Hamilton
Riverlea, a township in Florida, Gauteng, South Africa

See also
Riverlea Park, South Australia, a northern suburb of Adelaide